The 1964–65 Rheinlandliga was the 13th season of the highest amateur class of the Rhineland Football Association under the name of 1. Amateurliga Rheinland. It was a predecessor of today's Rheinlandliga.

Results
Rhineland champion was SpVgg Bendorf.  SSV Mülheim participated as a Rhineland representative in the German football amateur championship 1965, failed there in the quarter finale against the Westphalia representative SpVgg Erkenschwick.

The relegation to the second amateur league was made by SC Oberlahnstein, [VfB Wissen]] and newcomer TuS Mosella Schweich. For the following 1965–66 season, SV Prüm, FV Rübenach and Sportfreunde Herdorf moved up from the 2. Amateur league, as well as from the descendant Germania Metternich from the II. Division.

References

1964 in association football
Football in Rhineland-Palatinate
1965 in association football